Julia Allison Clarke is an American paleontologist and evolutionary biologist who studies the evolution of birds and the dinosaurs most closely related to living birds. She is the John A. Wilson Professor in Vertebrate Paleontology in the Jackson School of Geosciences and a Howard Hughes Medical Institute Professor at the University of Texas at Austin.

Education 
Clarke graduated with a B.A. in Comparative Literature and Geobiology from Brown University in 1995. She went on to study at Yale University, earning a Ph.D. from the Department of Geology and Geophysics in 2002.

Career
In 2005, Clarke led a research team that reexamined a fossil discovered within the rocks of Vega Island in the Antarctic in 1992. The use of computer tomography (CT) scans allowed for a new and more detailed analysis of the partial skeleton and it was determined to be Vegavis iaai, an extinct Antarctic bird and early relative of ducks and geese and thought to be the only species of modern bird to have lived at the time of the dinosaurs.

Clarke also studied the voice organ (syrinx) of a fossil originally found in 1992. The findings by Clarke and other researchers were published in the science journal Nature.

Fossils of the ancient bird Inkayacu were first discovered in 2008, on the Pacific coast of Ica, Peru. A nearly complete skeleton was uncovered  in the Paracas National Reserve by a team led by Rodolfo Salas and studied by a team led by Clarke. This was the first recovered fossil with feathers attached to it. The feathers were preserved enough such that Liliana D'Alba and Ali J. Altamirano were able to perform analysis of the melanosomes, which are responsible for pigment. Until now, without the addition of feathers, there has not been any research conducted on the nanostructure of ancient feathers. Large penguins, including the species Perudyptes devriesi and Icadyptes salasi, had been described from the area the previous year.

In 2014, Clarke and collaborators published findings that the reconstruction of colors of featherless dinosaurs may not be possible because they lack diversity in melanosomes, organelles that hold melanin.

In 2016, Clarke speculated that, based on her research, it was unlikely that dinosaurs roared. She proposed that it was much more likely that they made noises similar to those made by a modern pigeon.

In 2018, she was reporting on a small chicken sized dinosaur that was found in China by a farmer. The dinosaur was relatively well preserved and analysis indicated that it had multi-feathers. The creature is not thought to have been able to fly, but appears to have been a small carnivore. The feather's purpose may have been insulation whilst the variation in color is thought to have made the dinosaur attractive to a potential mate. The creature is thought to have a multi colored crest and this translates to its scientific name, which is Caihong juji.

Several of Clarke's technical papers have been published in Nature and Science.

Works include
 The Morphology and Systematic Position of Ichthyornis Marsh and the Phylogenetic Relationships of Basal Ornithurae, 2002
 Fossil Evidence for Evolution of the Shape and Color of Penguin Feathers, 2010
 Reconstruction of Microraptor and the Evolution of Iridescent Plumage, 2012
 Melanosome evolution indicates a key physiological shift within feathered dinosaurs, 2014
 Convergent evolution in dippers (Aves, Cinclidae): The only wing‐propelled diving songbirds, 2022
 Precise and nonscalar timing of intervals in a bird vocalization, 2022

References

Living people
Year of birth missing (living people)
American paleontologists
Women paleontologists
21st-century American scientists
21st-century American women scientists
Brown University alumni
Yale Graduate School of Arts and Sciences alumni
University of Texas faculty
Scientists from San Francisco
Scientists from California
American women academics